During the 2000–01 English football season, Sheffield United competed in the First Division.

Season summary
Neil Warnock's first full season saw the Blades flirting with the play-off places following pockets of good runs. A victory over rivals Sheffield Wednesday at Hillsborough was a highlight, but the Blades fell away from the play-off race to finish in 10th position.

Final league table

Results
Sheffield United's score comes first

Legend

Football League First Division

FA Cup

League Cup

Players

First-team squad
Squad at end of season

Left club during season

References

Notes

Sheffield United F.C. seasons
Sheffield United